The following is a timeline of the evolution of major-league-caliber franchises in Negro league baseball. The franchises included are those of high-caliber independent teams prior to the organization of formal league play in 1920 and concludes with the dissolution of the remnant of the last major Negro league team, the Kansas City Monarchs then based out of Grand Rapids, Michigan, in about 1966.  (The Indianapolis Clowns continued on through about 1988, but they had morphed into an entertainment act much as the Harlem Globetrotters basketball team of today.)  All teams who played a season while a member of a major Negro league are included.  The major leagues are the original Negro National League, the Eastern Colored League, the American Negro League, the East–West League, the second Negro National League and the Negro American League.  Teams from the 1932 original Negro Southern League are also included which allows for the inclusion of the few high caliber minor Negro league teams.

Graphical timeline of Negro league teams 

The two thick gray lines represent trying times: the first is the Panic of 1893 and the second is the Great Depression in 1933. Both crisis led to financial ruin and collapse of most teams and leagues.  The two thick black lines represent the formation of organized league play in 1920 and the integration of Major League Baseball in 1946.  After integration, the level of play deteriorated rapidly and dramatically.  By 1950 all teams were considered to be of minor league status.

See also 

 Timeline of Major League Baseball

References 
 Seamheads.com Teams - All-Time
  CNLBR Negro League Teams & Minor League Teams

External links 

 Seamheads.com Negro Leagues Database
 Center for Negro League Baseball Research
 Negro Leagues @ Baseball-Reference.com
 Negro League Baseball Players Association
 Negro Leagues Baseball Museum web site

Negro league baseball
Articles which contain graphical timelines
Negro league baseball teams